The 2020 Drydene 311 was a NASCAR Cup Series race held on August 23, 2020, at Dover International Speedway in Dover, Delaware. Scheduled to be contested over 400 laps but shortened to 311 laps because of the doubleheader format on the 1-mile (1.6 km) concrete speedway, it was the 25th race of the 2020 NASCAR Cup Series season.

Report

Background

Dover International Speedway is an oval race track in Dover, Delaware, United States that has held at least two NASCAR races since it opened in 1969. In addition to NASCAR, the track also hosted USAC and the NTT IndyCar Series. The track features one layout, a  concrete oval, with 24° banking in the turns and 9° banking on the straights. The speedway is owned and operated by Dover Motorsports.

The track, nicknamed "The Monster Mile", was built in 1969 by Melvin Joseph of Melvin L. Joseph Construction Company, Inc., with an asphalt surface, but was replaced with concrete in 1995. Six years later in 2001, the track's capacity moved to 135,000 seats, making the track have the largest capacity of sports venue in the mid-Atlantic. In 2002, the name changed to Dover International Speedway from Dover Downs International Speedway after Dover Downs Gaming and Entertainment split, making Dover Motorsports. From 2007 to 2009, the speedway worked on an improvement project called "The Monster Makeover", which expanded facilities at the track and beautified the track. After the 2014 season, the track's capacity was reduced to 95,500 seats.

Entry list
 (R) denotes rookie driver.
 (i) denotes driver who are ineligible for series driver points.

Qualifying
Matt DiBenedetto was awarded the pole for the race as determined by the top 20 from Saturday's finishing order inverted.

Starting Lineup

Race

Stage Results

Stage One
Laps: 70

Stage Two
Laps: 115

Final Stage Results

Stage Three
Laps: 126

Race statistics
 Lead changes: 15 among 6 different drivers
 Cautions/Laps: 7 for 40
 Red flags: 1 for 12 minutes and 19 seconds
 Time of race: 2 hours, 48 minutes and 7 seconds
 Average speed:

Media

Television
NBC Sports covered the race on the television side. Rick Allen, 2006 race winner Jeff Burton, Steve Letarte and 2001 race winner Dale Earnhardt Jr. covered the race from the booth at Charlotte Motor Speedway. Dave Burns, Parker Kligerman and Dillon Welch handled the pit road duties on site.

Radio
MRN had the radio call for the race, which was also simulcast on Sirius XM NASCAR Radio.

Standings after the race

Drivers' Championship standings

Manufacturers' Championship standings

Note: Only the first 16 positions are included for the driver standings.
. – Driver has clinched a position in the NASCAR Cup Series playoffs.

References

Drydene 500
Drydene 500
NASCAR races at Dover Motor Speedway
Drydene 311 Sunday